Rouge is an album by French jazz musician Louis Sclavis, recorded in 1991 and released in 1992 on the ECM label. It was reissued in 2006 and 2019.

Reception
In a review for Jazzwise, Robert Shore wrote: "I don't know what the Frenchman's inspiration for the title of this recording was – Rouge (Red) – but there's a fair bit of intergalactic shimmering going on in clarinetist/saxophonist Sclavis's ECM debut from 1991. And, of course, ECM is very good at capturing this sort of soundscape... It's a heady brew, pitched somewhere between avant-garde jazz and chamber music." According to The Penguin Guide to Jazz, "Sclavis's ECM debut is a challenging and surprisingly abstract set that rarely allows itself to settle into a jazz groove. Rouge establishes Sclavis as an enterprising and thought-provoking composer. If it does so at the expense of rhythmic energy (a strategy consistent with his ambivalence about jazz percussion), it doesn't short-change in other departments."

Track listing
 "One" (Louis Sclavis, Dominique Pifarély) - 2:35 
 "Nacht" (Louis Sclavis) - 8:04
 "Kali la nuit" (François Raulin) - 5:20
 "Reflet" (Louis Sclavis) - 3:05
 "Reeves" (François Raulin) - 7:03
 "Les bouteilles" (Louis Sclavis) - 7:52
 "Moment donné" (Dominique Pifarély) - 4:16
 "Face Nord" (Louis Sclavis) - 10:33
 "Rouge" (Louis Sclavis) - 5:15 / "Pourquoi une valse" (Louis Sclavis, François Raulin) - 1:24
 "Yes love" (Louis Sclavis) - 5:57

Personnel
 Louis Sclavis - Clarinets, Soprano Saxophone
 Dominique Pifarély - Violin
 Bruno Chevillon - Bass
  - Piano, Synthesizer
 Christian Ville - Drums

References 

1992 albums
ECM Records albums
Albums produced by Manfred Eicher
Louis Sclavis albums